Aaspere is a village in Haljala Parish, Lääne-Viru County, in northeastern Estonia. It is about 20 kilometres away from Rakvere.

Aaspere manor

Aaspere manor was mentioned for the first time in the 16th century. The current building received its appearance around 1800. The manor is one of the finest examples in Estonia of neoclassical manor house architecture. The manor was damaged in a fire in 1966. The manor is surrounded by a grandly designed park.

Notable residents
Aaspere was the birthplace of physician and botanist Bernhard Saarsoo (1899–1964).

References

External links
Aaspere manor at Estonian Manors Portal

Villages in Lääne-Viru County
Manor houses in Estonia
Kreis Wierland